Coolia tropicalis is a species of dinoflagellates, first found in Belize.

Its cell size ranges from 23–40 μm long, 25–39 μm wide and 35–65 μm in dorsoventral diameter. Cells are spherical, smooth and covered with scattered round pores. Its epitheca is smaller than its hypotheca. Its apical pore is straight, 7 μm long and situated in the apical plate complex. Cells of C. tropicalis are distinguished from C. monotis by the wedge-shaped plate 1′, a four-sided 3’ plate, and a short apical pore.

References

Further reading

External links

Protists described in 1995
Dinoflagellate species
Gonyaulacales